Air for Free is the eighth studio album by Relient K, released on July 22, 2016, through Mono vs Stereo. The album's lead single, "Bummin'", was released on April 13, 2016. It is the first album since Five Score and Seven Years Ago (2007) to feature drummer Dave Douglas, though he is not credited as an official member. It also features the return of producer Mark Lee Townsend following his absence on Collapsible Lung (2013).

Release and promotion 
A week before its official release, Air for Free was streamed in its entirety on Pandora Radio.
In support of the album, Relient K played an album-release show in their home state of Ohio on July 23, 2016, with Cardboard Kids opening, and later embarked on the Looking for America Tour with Switchfoot. The tour ran from September 16, beginning in Denver, Colorado, through November 26, concluding in San Francisco, California.

Commercial performance 

Air for Free debuted at its peak of No. 44 on the Billboard 200 and also No. 1 album on the Top Christian Albums Chart, selling 9,000 copies in its opening week.

Critical reception 

The album was met with critical acclaim. Writing for Jesus Freak Hideout, Michael Weaver states, "Air for Free could be described as what Collapsible Lung should've been"; in a similar vein, Cortney Warner declares that the album "proves the band is far from 'has been' status, and continues to create fresh, thoughtful music that anyone can enjoy." In his review for CM Addict, Michael Tackett says, "Air for Free is lyrically and musically a welcome return to form for Relient K." Writing for AllMusic, Neil Z. Yeung called the album a "lush and joyful affair" featuring a "sunny, creative blend of indie rock and contemporary pop."

Track listing

Vinyl

Personnel 
Credits adapted from the album's liner notes.

Relient K
 Matt Thiessen – vocals, acoustic piano, programming, guitars, ukulele, trumpet
 Matt Hoopes – keyboards, guitars, Omnichord, trumpet, Boss HC-2 percussion synth, backing vocals

Additional musicians
 Mark Lee Townsend – guitars, bass, backing vocals
 Bill Mitchell – additional guitars
 Dave Douglas – drums, backing vocals
 Tom Breyfogle – drums, percussion
 Roger Bissell – trombone
 Brandon Calderon – trombone
 Jake Germany – Boss HC-2, additional backng vocals
 AJ Babcock – additional backing vocals
 Austin Cunningham – additional backing vocals
 Tiffany Fernandez – additional backing vocals
 Lisa Goe – additional backing vocals
 Billy Raffoul – additional backing vocals

Production
 Mark Lee Townsend – producer, recording, mixing (6, 11)
 Brandon Calderon – recording assistant 
 Seth Morton – recording assistant 
 Steve Marcantonio – mixing (1-5, 7-10, 12-16)
 Tom Breyfogle – editing
 David A. Terry – mastering
 Jake Germany – art direction, design
 Josh Ness – photography
 Brandon McGowan – graphics
 Dawn Hepp – management 
 Kevin Spellman – management

Charts

Release history 
Sources: Amazon.com, SMLXL Vinyl

References

External links

2016 albums
Relient K albums
Albums produced by Mark Lee Townsend
Mono vs Stereo albums